is a Japanese footballer currently playing as a midfielder for Tokyo Verdy.

Career statistics

Club
.

Notes

References

External links

2005 births
Living people
Association football people from Tokyo
Japanese people of Bangladeshi descent
Japanese footballers
Japan youth international footballers
Association football midfielders
J2 League players
Tokyo Verdy players